Nothopuga is a genus of ammotrechid camel spiders, first described by Emilio Antonio Maury in 1976.

Species 
, the World Solifugae Catalog accepts the following three species:

 Nothopuga cuyana Maury, 1976 — Argentina
 Nothopuga lobera Maury, 1976 — Argentina
 Nothopuga telteca Iuri, 2021 — Argentina

References 

Arachnid genera
Solifugae